Nancy Yasecko is a media artist and educator who grew up and is still living on the Space Coast of Florida.  She graduated from Cocoa Beach High School in 1972  and received her B.A. from the University of South Florida in 1975, and her M.A. in Instructional Technology from the University of Central Florida 1997.

Biography

Nancy Yasecko is the proprietor of Vanguard Productions, located on Merritt Island, FL, a producer of film and video for PBS broadcast and non-profit and governmental organizations.

Her film Growing Up with Rockets was included with the first group of US documentaries to be screened in the former Soviet Union in the American Documentary Showcase, Glastnost Tour 1990. The source materials used in the film are held by the Smithsonian National Air and Space Museum.

Educational work

Arts Mentor - Space Coast FIRST Robotics Competition Team 233
Launchpad to Learning - Interactive web-based engineering environment for middle school students
Vanguard Productions—Development of film and video media for PBS, non-profit and governmental organizations
Instructional Designer for online corporate training and assessment

Filmography
Mapping, 1978, producer and director
Missiles, 1978, producer and director
Composition, 1979, producer and director
Soft Sand, 1980, producer and director
Dancing Lessons, 1981, producer and director
Nebraska Avenue, 1981, producer and director
Growing Up with Rockets, 1986, producer, director, editor 
Living in America: A Hundred Years of Ybor City, 1985, editor
Journey Into Wilderness: Florida's Indian River Lagoon, 1990, producer and director
"History In Song (Series), 1992, producer and director
"Encounters in a New World", "Florida Stories: History and Legend", and "Changing Florida: Dreams and Realities" producer and director
Moon Shot, 1994, Associate Producer and Line producer
Brevard County Oral History Video Project, 1992–1995, producer and director 
Ellis Marsalis: Jazz is Spoken Here, 2000, producer and director
Entre Act, 2004, producer and director
Making Movies with Bud, 2005, producer and director
The FIRST Robot Rock Opera, 2007, producer and director

References

External links

"Growing Up with Rockets" cover
"Jazz is Spoken Here" synopsis

American cinematographers
American film editors
American women film editors
University of South Florida alumni
University of Central Florida alumni
People from Brevard County, Florida
Living people
Year of birth missing (living people)
Film directors from Florida
Film producers from Florida
21st-century American women